Protul Chandra Sorcar (23 February 19136 January 1971) was an Indian magician. He was an internationally active magician throughout the 1950s and 1960s, performing his Indrajal show before live audiences and on television. Sorcar died of a heart attack at the age of 57 in Asahikawa, Hokkaidō, Japan, on 6 January 1971, where he was performing.

Career
At the age of 21, Sorcar decided to give up formal education (he was likely to study to become an engineer), and decided to become a conjuror despite the profession's low esteem in India.

Sorcar became famous in the mid-1930s, when he performed shows in Kolkata and also in Japan and several other countries. Among other routines, he performed a Floating Lady routine featuring aerial suspension in 1964. Ganapati Chakraborty was his mentor.

In 1956, he performed the sawing a woman in half illusion on the BBC's Panorama program. When he performed it on live television, it drew huge attention in the United Kingdom because the climax made it appear as though the women had actually been cut in half and died, which caused a public panic.

His self-appointed title was "The World's Greatest Magician".

Sorcar died in Japan in 1971.

Personal life
Sorcar was married to Basanti Devi. They were the parents of the animator, director and laserist Manick Sorcar and magicians P. C. Sorcar Jr. and P. C. Sorcar, Young.

Awards

 Jadusamrat P.C. Sorcar Sarani The Government of India has named a major street in Calcutta after him
 Padma Shri (the Lotus), awarded by the President of India on 26 January 1964
 The Sphinx (Oscar of Magic), US, 1946 and 1954
 The Royal Medallion, German Magic Circle

Postage stamp

On 23 February 2010, India Post issued a commemorative stamp to honour him.

Publications

Magic for You (1966)
More Magic for You (1965)
History of Magic (1970)
Indian Magic (1983)

See also
Indian magicians

References

External links
 P.C. Sorcar International Library

1913 births
1971 deaths
Historians of magic
Indian magicians
Artists from Kolkata
Recipients of the Padma Shri in arts
People from Tangail District
P.C.
Ananda Mohan College alumni